Kenneth Paal is a professional footballer who plays as a left back for Championship club Queens Park Rangers and the Suriname national football team. Born in the Netherlands, Paal represented them at U17 level before switching to Suriname at senior level.

Club career
Paal made his professional debut for Jong PSV playing in the Eerste Divisie, the 2nd tier of professional football in the Netherlands, on 9 August 2014 against Achilles '29. He started in the first eleven at the first fixture of the 2014–15 season. 

In June 2018, Paal joined PEC Zwolle on loan for the 2018–19 season with the club holding the option to buy. In May 2019, he signed a three-year contract with the club.

Queens Park Rangers
On 19 June 2022, Paal joined Championship club Queens Park Rangers on a three-year contract following the mutual termination of his contract with PEC Zwolle. He scored his first goal for QPR in a 3-0 win against Cardiff City on 19 October 2022.

Personal life
Born in the Netherlands, Paal is of Surinamese descent.

On 31 May 2022 it was announced that Paal was officially eligible to represent Suriname at the 2022–23 CONCACAF Nations League. Due to contract negotiations for a new club, Paal was unavailable to play for Natio. On 22 September 2022 Paal made his debut for his Suriname, in friendly against Nicaragua. It was held in Almere, Netherlands and resulted in a 2-1 victory for Suriname.

Career statistics

References

External links
 Career stats & Profile - Voetbal International
 

1997 births
Living people
Footballers from Arnhem
Association football defenders
Surinamese footballers
Suriname international footballers
Dutch footballers
Netherlands youth international footballers
Dutch sportspeople of Surinamese descent
Jong PSV players
PSV Eindhoven players
PEC Zwolle players
Queens Park Rangers F.C. players
Eredivisie players
Eerste Divisie players
Expatriate footballers in England
Surinamese expatriates in England
Dutch expatriate footballers
English Football League players